Thomas Curran (November 18, 1868 – November 12, 1928) was an American politician and businessman.

Biography
Curran was born in Chicago, Illinois. He was a merchant. Curran also served as the superintendent of the Chicago West Park Board. Curran served in the Illinois House of Representatives from 1907 until his death in 1928. He was a Republican. Curran was killed in an automobile accident when the automobile hit a tree on Wisconsin Highway 41, five miles west from Kenosha, Wisconsin. Curran and his passengers were driving from Waukesha, Wisconsin to Chicago.

References

1868 births
1928 deaths
Businesspeople from Chicago
Politicians from Chicago
Republican Party members of the Illinois House of Representatives
Road incident deaths in Wisconsin